Clive Edward Benedict Schlee (born March 1959) is a British businessman, and was CEO of the UK fast food chain Pret a Manger from 2003-2019. He is related to several companies, e. g. ITSU Limited, Action Rock Limited, Shire Cape Limited.

Early life
Clive Edward Benedict Schlee was born in March 1959 in London, and brought up there and in Suffolk. He was educated at Rugby School and received a First in history from University College, Oxford.

Career
Schlee started his career in 1980 with Jardine Matheson, and spent 17 years there, rising to lead their worldwide restaurant businesses from Hong Kong, before joining Pret in 1997 as managing director, retiring from his role as CEO in 2019. He is also a director and 50% owner of the sushi chain Itsu.

Personal life
Schlee is married with three children.

References

1959 births
British businesspeople
Living people